Corzano is a town and comune in the province of Brescia, in Lombardy, Italy. As of 2011 its population was 1,397.

History
The name Corzano is derived from the Roman family name Curtius. In the 15th century the Avogadro family built a castle in the village Meano, which is part of the comune. It was part of the Republic of Venice until its dissolution at the end of the 18th century.

Geography
The bordering municipalities are Barbariga, Brandico, Comezzano-Cizzago, Dello, Longhena, Pompiano and Trenzano.

Corzano counts the hamlets (frazioni) of Bargnano, Meano and Montegiardino. The last one was an autonomous municipality until 1797.

Demographics
The 2001 census gives the population as 980 people, composed of 359 families.

References

External links

  Corzano official website

Cities and towns in Lombardy